Atelopus eusebiodiazi is a species of toads in the family Bufonidae. It is endemic to north-western Peru and only known from its type locality in Huamba, near Ayabaca, Piura Region. The specific name eusebiodiazi honors Eusebio Diaz, taxidermist at the Museum of Natural History, Lima, and the collector of the holotype.

Description
Atelopus eusebiodiazi is a relatively large Atelopus: adult males measure  and females  in snout–vent length. The head is longer than it is wide. There is no tympanum. The body is robust with relatively short limbs. The fingers are unwebbed whereas the toes have some webbing. Coloration of living specimens is unknown. In preservative, the dorsum is either chocolate brown with irregular black blotches and some yellowish cream blotches on flanks, or black with some irregular yellowish cream marks and a yellowish cream irregular dorso-lateral stripe. The venter is cream (sometimes with small black blotches), as are the palms and soles.

Habitat and conservation
Specimens have been spotted in leaf litter and along small streams. Presumably, breeding takes place in fast-flowing streams.

As of 2018, the species had last been observed in 1997—surveys in 2001 and 2006 failed to find it. It is possible that it is extinct, as only patches of suitable habitat remain. The type locality is threatened by habitat loss caused by increasing cattle grazing and agricultural land use.

References

eusebiodiazi
Endemic fauna of Peru
Amphibians of Peru
Amphibians of the Andes
Amphibians described in 2008
Taxa named by Alessandro Catenazzi
Taxa named by Karen Siu-Ting
Taxa named by Pablo J. Venegas